Ummendorf is a town in the district of Biberach in Baden-Württemberg in Germany.

Attractions
Ummendorf is located on the main route of the Upper Swabian Baroque Route.

Buildings
 Catholic church Johanneskirche, 1805
 Castle Ummendorfer Schloss, 1560
 Castle Schloss Horn at Fischbach

References

Biberach (district)
Württemberg